Daun kalan is a village in Patiala district, India. The Daun Kalan village has population of 3482 of which 1868 are males while 1614 are females as per Population Census 2011.

References 

Villages in Patiala district